Organosilicon chemistry is the science of the preparation and properties of organosilicon compounds, which are organometallic compounds containing carbon–silicon bonds. Most organosilicon compounds are similar to the ordinary organic compounds, being colourless, flammable, hydrophobic, and stable to air. Silicon carbide is an inorganic compound.

History 

In 1863 Charles Friedel and James Crafts made the first organochlorosilane compound. The same year they also described a «polysilicic acid ether» in the preparation of ethyl- and methyl-o-silicic acid. Extensive research in the field of organosilicon compounds was pioneerd in the beginning of 20th century by Frederic S. Kipping. He also had coined the term "silicone" (resembling ketones, this is errorneous though) in relation to these materials in 1904. In recognition of Kipping's achievements the Dow Chemical Company had established an award in 1960s that is given for significant contributions into the silicon chemistry. In his works Kipping was noted for using Grignard reagents to make alkylsilanes and arylsilanes and the preparation of silicone oligomers and polymers for the first time.

In 1945 Eugene G. Rochow has also made a significant contribution into the organosilicon chemistry by first describing Müller-Rochow process.

Occurrence and applications
Organosilicon compounds are widely encountered in commercial products. Most common are antifoamers, caulks (sealant), adhesives, and coatings made from silicones. Other important uses include agricultural and plant control adjuvants commonly used in conjunction with herbicides and fungicides.

Biology and medicine
Carbon–silicon bonds are absent in biology, however enzymes have been used to artificially create carbon-silicon bonds in living microbes. Silicates, on the other hand, have known existence in diatoms. Silafluofen is an organosilicon compound that functions as a pyrethroid insecticide. Several organosilicon compounds have been investigated as pharmaceuticals.

Bonding
In the great majority of organosilicon compounds, Si is tetravalent with tetrahedral molecular geometry. Compared to carbon–carbon bonds, carbon–silicon bonds are longer and weaker. The C–Si bond is somewhat polarised towards carbon due to carbon's greater electronegativity (C 2.55 vs Si 1.90). The strength of the Si-O bond is strikingly high, and this feature is exploited in many reactions such as the Sakurai reaction, the Brook rearrangement, the Fleming–Tamao oxidation, and the Peterson olefination. Another manifestation is the β-silicon effect describes the stabilizing effect of a β-silicon atom on a carbocation with many implications for reactivity.

Preparation
The first organosilicon compound, tetraethylsilane, was prepared by Charles Friedel and James Crafts in 1863 by reaction of tetrachlorosilane with diethylzinc.

The bulk of organosilicon compounds derive from organosilicon chlorides . These chlorides are produced by the "Direct process", which entails the reaction of methyl chloride with a silicon-copper alloy. The main and most sought-after product is dimethyldichlorosilane:
2  + Si → 
A variety of other products are obtained, including trimethylsilyl chloride and methyltrichlorosilane. About 1 million tons of organosilicon compounds are prepared annually by this route. The method can also be used for phenyl chlorosilanes.

Hydrosilylation

Another major method for the formation of Si-C bonds is hydrosilylation (also called hydrosilation). In this process, compounds with Si-H bonds (hydrosilanes) add to unsaturated substrates. Commercially, the main substrates are alkenes. Other unsaturated functional groups—alkynes, imines, ketones, and aldehydes, but these reactions are of little economic value. An example is the hydrosilation of phenylacetylene:

Hydrosilylation requires metal catalysts, especially those based on platinum group metals.

In the related silylmetalation, a metal replaces the hydrogen atom.

Cleavage or Si-Si bonds
Hexamethyldisilane reacts with methyl lithium to give trimethylsilyl lithium:

Similarly, tris(trimethylsilyl)silyl lithium is derived from tetrakis(trimethylsilyl)silane:

Functional groups
Silicon is a component of many functional groups. Most of these are analogous to organic compounds. The overarching exception is the rarity of multiple bonds to silicon, as reflected in the double bond rule.

Silanols, siloxides, and siloxanes 
Silanols are analogues of alcohols. They are generally prepared by hydrolysis of silyl chlorides:
 +  →  + HCl
Less frequently silanols are prepared by oxidation of silyl hydrides, a reaction that uses a metal catalyst:
2  +  → 2 

They are about 500x more acidic than the corresponding alcohols. Siloxides are the deprotonated derivatives of silanols:
 + NaOH →  + 

Silanols tend to dehydrate to give siloxanes:
2  →  + 
Polymers with repeating siloxane linkages are called silicones. Compounds with an Si=O double bond called silanones are extremely unstable.

Silyl ethers
Silyl ethers have the connectivity Si-O-C. They are typically prepared by the reaction of alcohols with silyl chlorides:
 + ROH →  + HCl
Silyl ethers are extensively used as protective groups for alcohols.

Exploiting the strength of the Si-F bond, fluoride sources such as tetra-n-butylammonium fluoride (TBAF) are used in deprotection of silyl ethers:
 +  +  →  + H-O-R +

Silyl chlorides

Organosilyl chlorides are important commodity chemicals. They are mainly used to produce silicone polymers as described above. Especially important silyl chlorides are dimethyldichlorosilane, methyltrichlorosilane, and trimethylsilyl chloride are all produced by direct process. More specialized derivatives that find commercial applications include dichloromethylphenylsilane, trichloro(chloromethyl)silane, trichloro(dichlorophenyl)silane, trichloroethylsilane, and phenyltrichlorosilane.

Although proportionately a minor outlet, organosilicon compounds are widely used in organic synthesis. Notably trimethylsilyl chloride  is the main silylating agent. One classic method called the Flood reaction for the synthesis of this compound class is by heating hexaalkyldisiloxanes  with concentrated sulfuric acid and a sodium halide.

Silyl hydrides

The silicon to hydrogen bond is longer than the C–H bond (148 compared to 105 pm) and weaker (299 compared to 338 kJ/mol). Hydrogen is more electronegative than silicon hence the naming convention of silyl hydrides. Commonly the presence of the hydride is not mentioned in the name of the compound. Triethylsilane has the formula . The parent compound  is called silane.

Silenes
Organosilicon compounds, unlike their carbon counterparts, do not have a rich double bond chemistry. Compounds with silene Si=C bonds (also known as alkylidenesilanes) are laboratory curiosities such as the silicon benzene analogue silabenzene. In 1967, Gusel'nikov and Flowers provided the first evidence for silenes from pyrolysis of dimethylsilacyclobutane. The first stable (kinetically shielded) silene was reported in 1981 by Brook.

Disilenes have Si=Si double bonds and disilynes are silicon analogues of an alkyne. The first Silyne (with a silicon to carbon triple bond) was reported in 2010.

Siloles

Siloles, also called silacyclopentadienes, are members of a larger class of compounds called metalloles. They are the silicon analogs of cyclopentadienes and are of current academic interest due to their electroluminescence and other electronic properties. Siloles are efficient in electron transport. They owe their low lying LUMO to a favorable interaction between the antibonding sigma silicon orbital with an antibonding pi orbital of the butadiene fragment.

Pentacoordinated silicon

Unlike carbon, silicon compounds can be coordinated to five atoms as well in a group of compounds ranging from so-called silatranes, such as phenylsilatrane, to a uniquely stable pentaorganosilicate:

The stability of hypervalent silicon is the basis of the Hiyama coupling, a coupling reaction used in certain specialized organic synthetic applications. The reaction begins with the activation of Si-C bond by fluoride:
 + R"-X +  → R-R" +  +

Various reactions
Certain allyl silanes can be prepared from allylic esters such as 1 and monosilylcopper compounds, which are formed in situ by the reaction of the disilylzinc compound 2, with Copper Iodide, in:

In this reaction type, silicon polarity is reversed in a chemical bond with zinc and a formal allylic substitution on the benzoyloxy group takes place.

Environmental effects
Organosilicon compounds affect bee (and other insect) immune expression, making them more susceptible to viral infection.

See also
Compounds of carbon with period 3 elements: organoaluminum compounds, organophosphorus compounds, organosulfur compounds
Compounds of carbon with other group 14 elements: organogermanium compounds, organotin compounds, organolead compounds
Silylenes, the carbene counterparts
Silylenoids, the carbenoid counterparts
Decamethylsilicocene

References

External links
Magnus Walter's Selected Aspects of Organosilicon Chemistry
Silicon in organic synthesis
S. Marsden (Editor): Contemporary organosilicon chemistry. Thematic Series in the Open Access Beilstein Journal of Organic Chemistry.